The R529 is a Regional Route in South Africa.

Route
Its northern origin is the R81 in Giyani from there, it runs roughly south-west. It is briefly part of R71, and then continues through Letsitele to end at a junction with the R36 between Tzaneen and Ofcolaco.

Communities along the R529 
In the Giyani Area, the R529 passes through Sikhunyani, Bambeni, Mageva, Dzumeri Township, Ndhambi, Mphagani, Nkambako and in the Tzaneen Area it passes through Nkambako, Khangela, Mafarana and Letsitele

References

Regional Routes in Limpopo